General elections were held in British Guiana in September 1930.

Electoral system
Following the victory of the Popular Party in the 1926 elections, constitutional reforms in 1928 replaced the 22-member Combined Court with a new 30-member Legislative Council, which included an extra eight appointees, giving them a majority of seats over the elected members. The new Legislative Council consisted of the Governor, two ex-officio members, eight official members, five unofficial members and 14 members elected in single-member constituencies.

Results
Popular Party candidates were elected unopposed in eight constituencies as a result of disquiet over the 1928 constitutional reforms.

Aftermath
The first meeting of the newly elected Council was held on 16 October.

References

Elections in Guyana
1930 in British Guiana
British Guiana
Election and referendum articles with incomplete results
British Guiana